The Journal of Urology is a peer-reviewed medical journal covering urology published by Elsevier on behalf of the American Urological Association. It was established in 1917. A special centenary issue was released in 2017 to celebrate 100 years of the publication of the journal.

Over the years, it absorbed the Transactions of the American Urological Association (1907–1920), as well as Investigative Urology (1963–1981) and Urological Survey (1951–1981). Urological Survey was known as Quarterly Review of Urology from 1946 to 1950.

Editors
The following persons have been editor-in-chief of the journal:

Abstracting and indexing
The journal is abstracted and indexed in BIOSIS, Current Contents/Clinical Medicine, EMBASE/Excerpta Medica, MEDLINE, and Scopus.

References

External links 
 

Publications established in 1917
Elsevier academic journals
Monthly journals
English-language journals
Urology journals